Joseph Whitehead (1814 – March 12, 1894) was a Canadian railway pioneer and political figure. He represented Huron North in the 1st Canadian Parliament as a Liberal member.

He was born in Guisborough, Yorkshire, England in 1814. Whitehead was a fireman and engineer on railways in Britain, serving as fireman for George Stephenson's Locomotion in 1825. He later became involved in railway construction, helping to build the Caledonian Railway in Scotland. He came to Canada West in 1850 and help build sections of the Great Western Railway and  a section of the Grand Trunk Railway between Buffalo and Goderich. He also served as mayor for the town of Clinton, Ontario. Whitehead won contracts to build two sections of the transcontinental railway, the section between Cross Lake and Kenora and a branch line between Emerson and Saint Boniface, Manitoba. He built a sawmill at Saint Boniface to supply lumber during construction of the rail line. In 1877, he brought the first steam locomotive to Manitoba, The Countess of Dufferin, transporting it by boat up the Red River to Winnipeg. For a time, he worked in the timber trade in Manitoba, but later retired to Clinton, where his descendants still live as of 2018. He died there in 1894.

References
 
The Canadian parliamentary companion, HJ Morgan (1871)
Manitobans who made a difference
The Canadian album : Men of Canada; or, Success by example ..., W Cochrane (1891)

1814 births
1894 deaths
Liberal Party of Canada MPs
Members of the House of Commons of Canada from Ontario
Mayors of places in Ontario
Canadian people in rail transport
Canadian railway entrepreneurs
British railway civil engineers
People from Guisborough
19th-century Canadian businesspeople
Engineers from Yorkshire